The women's 57 kilograms (lightweight) competition at the 2006 Asian Games in Doha was held on 4 December at the Qatar SC Indoor Hall.

Schedule
All times are Arabia Standard Time (UTC+03:00)

Results

Main bracket

Repechage

References

Results

External links
 
 Official website

W57
Judo at the Asian Games Women's Lightweight
Asian W57